Sumkar District is a district in the north of Madang Province in Papua New Guinea. It is one of the six administrative districts that make up the province. Sumkar is a district which is made up of Karkar Island and part of mainland NCR.

References
 

Districts of Papua New Guinea